Imperia is an Italian city.

Imperia may also refer to:
 Imperium (plural imperia), form of authority held by a citizen to control a military or governmental entity in ancient Rome
 Province of Imperia, the Italian province of the above city of Imperia
 IMPERIA, a vodka produced by Russian Standard
 Imperia (statue), a statue in Constance, Germany
 Imperia Automobiles, a Belgian automobile maker
 Imperia submachine gun
 Imperia La Divina, a famous Roman courtesan